In animation, a walk cycle is a series of frames or illustrations drawn in sequence that loop to create an animation of a walking character. The walk cycle is looped over and over, thus having to avoid animating each step again.

Creating a walk cycle
Walk cycles can be broken up into four key frames: the forward contact point, the first passing pose, the back contact point, and the second passing pose. Frames that are drawn between these key poses (traditionally known as in-betweens) are either hand-drawn or interpolated using computer software. 

Besides the apparent move of the legs, many more details are necessary for a convincing walk cycle, like animation timing, movement of the arms, head and torsion of the whole body.

There exist many techniques to create walk cycles. Traditionally, walk cycles are hand-drawn, but over time with the introduction of new technologies for new mediums, walk cycles can be made in pixel art, 2D computer graphics, 3D computer graphics, stop motion, and cut-out animation, or using techniques like rotoscoping.

References

External links
 The Walk and the Whip(archived) sample animation with video (awn.com)

Animation techniques